Dizzy Dishes is an animated cartoon created by Fleischer Studios in 1930, as part of the Talkartoon series. It is noted for being the first cartoon in which Betty Boop appears.

Plot
The cartoon begins with four anthropomorphic flapper cats singing "Crazy Town". Chef Bimbo waits on a hungry gorilla and then goes to the kitchen to prepare the order, roast duck. When he is about to bring it to the gorilla's table, he sees Betty Boop performing on stage and falls in love at first sight. He forgets about the hungry gorilla and dances on stage with the duck. The gorilla, furious, goes after Bimbo, who escapes on a wooden train.

Notes
The as-yet-unevolved Betty Boop is drawn as an anthropomorphic female dog. She is merely a side character; the main plotline revolves around the incompetent chef Bimbo and the irate gorilla. "Crazy Town," sung by the flapper cats in the beginning of the cartoon, is also the theme song for the 1932 film Crazy Town.

Home video releases
In the 1990s, this cartoon was released as part of the Betty Boop - The Definitive Collection laserdisc set. On September 24, 2013, Olive Films (under license from Paramount Home Entertainment) released this cartoon as part of the Betty Boop: The Essential Collection - Volume Two DVD and Blu-ray sets.

References

External links
 
 Dizzy Dishes on YouTube

1930s English-language films
1930s American animated films
1930 animated films
1930 short films
1930s animated short films
American animated short films
American black-and-white films
Betty Boop cartoons
Fleischer Studios short films
Paramount Pictures short films
Short films directed by Dave Fleischer
Animated films about gorillas